Say Less may refer to:

Say Less (album), 2017 album by Roy Woods
"Say Less", the title track
"Say Less" (Ashanti song), 2017 single by Ashanti
"Say Less" (Dillon Francis song), 2017 single by Dillon Francis featuring G-Eazy